Adhi Sankar is an Indian politician and former member of the Parliament of India from Kallakurichi Constituency. He represents the Dravida Munnetra Kazhagam party.

References 

Living people
India MPs 1999–2004
India MPs 2009–2014
Dravida Munnetra Kazhagam politicians
Lok Sabha members from Tamil Nadu
1957 births
People from Viluppuram district
People from Cuddalore district